Almazbek Raiymkulov, better known as Kid Diamond (born February 18, 1977 in Kyrgyzstan) was a boxer in the Lightweight division. He was NABF Champion, and among the first professional fighters from Kyrgyzstan to become known worldwide. He turned professional after placing fourth at the Sydney Summer Olympics (2000). 

Raiymukulov lives and trains in Las Vegas, Nevada, USA.

Amateur career
Raiymkulov represented his country Kyrgyzstan in the 2000 Sydney Olympic Games as a Lightweight fighter.  His results were:
Defeated Tumentsetseg Uitumen (Mongolia) 15-4
Defeated Jose Cruz Lasso (Colombia) 12-9
Lost to Cristian Bejarano (Mexico) 12-14
He was fourth at the World Amateur Ranking 2000-2004.

Professional career
Raiymkulov turned professional in 2001.  After he started his professional career he won 20 fights without any losses or draws. In June 2005 Raiymkulov had match for World Champion Title in New York, Madison Square Garden against 4 time Lightweight World Champion Cuban Joel Casamayor.  After 12 rounds, the HBO scoring were giving Kid Diamond a win with a 116-111 score, but the match was ruled a draw. 

Following the draw, Diamond entered a bout against Nate Campbell as a heavy favorite and with much hype, but was outclassed and knocked out on the bout.  In 2006 Raiymkulov became NABF Champion, defending his title four times.  He later lost to Antonio DeMarco and hasn't fought since.

Personal info
*birth date	1977-02-18
division	lightweight, 135 lbs
stance	orthodox
height	5′ 7″   /   170 cm
US ID	061262
alias	Kid Diamond
nationality 	Kyrgyz
residence	Las Vegas, Nevada, Los Angeles, California, United States
birthplace	Kyrgyzstan

External links
 
 

1977 births
Living people
Lightweight boxers
Kyrgyzstani male boxers
Olympic boxers of Kyrgyzstan
Boxers at the 2000 Summer Olympics
Boxers at the 1998 Asian Games
Asian Games competitors for Kyrgyzstan